La Riera is one of fifteen parishes (administrative divisions) in Somiedo, a municipality within the province and autonomous community of Asturias, in northern Spain.

The postal code is 33841.

Villages
 La Riera
 Las Viñas
 Villaux (Villaús)

Parishes in Somiedo